Shivajinagar may refer to various places in India:

Places
 Shivajinagar, Bangalore, Karnataka
 Shivajinagar, Chandrapur, Maharashtra
 Shivajinagar, Mumbai, Maharashtra
 Shivajinagar, Pune, Maharashtra
 Shivajinagar, Ratnagiri, Maharashtra
 Shivajinagar, Ulwe, Maharastra

Constituencies
 Shivajinagar (Mumbai Vidhan Sabha constituency), or Shivajinagar Mankhurd, an assembly constituency of Mumbai Suburban, Maharashtra
 Shivajinagar, Karnataka Assembly constituency, an assembly constituency of Shivajinagar, Bangalore, Karnataka
 Shivajinagar, Maharashtra Assembly constituency, an assembly constituency of Shivajinagar, Pune, Maharashtra

Other uses
 Shivajinagara (film), a 2014 Indian Kannada-language film